Muntelier-Löwenberg railway station is a railway station in the municipality of Murten, in the Swiss canton of Fribourg. It is located at the northern junction of the standard gauge Fribourg–Ins and Palézieux–Lyss lines of Swiss Federal Railways. It takes its name from the nearby municipality of Muntelier.

Services 
 the following services stop at Muntelier-Löwenberg:

References

External links 
 
 

Railway stations in the canton of Fribourg
Swiss Federal Railways stations